Thanat Lowkhunsombat (also known as Lee, born 18 January 1993) is a Thai actor. He is known for his main roles as Survey in GMMTV's U-Prince Series  (2016–2017), as Play in Secret Seven (2017), as Pong in My Dear Loser: Monster Romance (2017) and as Kyro in Boy For Rent (2019).

Early life and education 
He graduated with a bachelor's degree in innovative management communication from the College of Social Communication Innovation at Srinakharinwirot University and is currently pursuing a master's degree in fine arts, major in innovative design from the Faculty of Fine Arts at the same university.

Prior to changing his name into Thanat, he initially changed his birth name into Phachon.

Career 
He started his acting career in 2017 by playing a main role in U-Prince Series: Badly Politics after he was declared as one of the winners in the "Finding U-Prince Project". He also took part in CLEO Thailand's 50 Most Eligible Bachelors of 2017 and won as "The Guy with the Most Alluring Move". In the same year, he got the main role of Play in Secret Seven and went on to take part in several television series such as My Dear Loser: Monster Romance, Wake Up Ladies: The Series, Friend Zone, Boy For Rent and Endless Love.

Currently, he is playing the role of Nont in Rerng Rita.

Filmography

Television

Music video appearance
 2016 Sieng Nai Jai (เสียงในใจ) - Pup Potato; Ohm Cocktail (Genierock/YouTube:Genierock)  
 2017 Tot Long Chai (ทดลองใช้) - Pun Basher (Genierock/YouTube:Genierock)  
 2017 Kon Bap Nai Dee (คนแบบไหนดี) Ost.Secret Seven - Bambam The Voice (GMMTV/YouTube:GMMTV RECORDS)  
 2018 Bot Rean Kong Krom Chenh Jai (บทเรียนของความเชื่อใจ) Ost.Wake Up Cha Nee The Series - Ben Chalatit (GMMTV/YouTube:GMMTV RECORDS)  
 2021  (ทิ้งเราทำไม) - Jackfanchan feat. VANGOE (Believe Music/YouTube:Jackfanchan)  
 2022 Jao Ying (เจ้าหญิง) Ost.My Sassy Princess 2022 - Marie Eugenie Le Lay (One Music (ชื่อเดิม : Exact Music)/YouTube:ช่อง one31) Kimmy Chermarin Cole

Awards

References

External links 
 
 

1993 births
Living people
Thanat Lowkhunsombat
Thanat Lowkhunsombat
Thanat Lowkhunsombat
Thanat Lowkhunsombat
Thanat Lowkhunsombat